Lukasz Maciej Mamczarz (born 14 June 1988) is a Polish Paralympic athlete who competes in F42 classification high jump events.

Athletics career
Mamczarz represented his country at the 2012 Summer Paralympics in London where he won a bronze medal in the high jump (T42). More medals followed in the IPC Athletics World Championships with a pair of bronze medals won in the high jump in 2013 in Lyon and 2015 in Doha. Mamczarz is also a double European Championships gold medalist, winning his event in both Swansea (2014) and Grosseto (2016).

Personal history
Mamczarz was born in Gorzów Wielkopolski, Poland in 1988. In 2009 he lost his left leg in a motorcycle accident. He took up sport after a recommendation by his doctors during his rehabilitation.

References 

Paralympic athletes of Poland
Athletes (track and field) at the 2012 Summer Paralympics
Paralympic gold medalists for Poland
Sportspeople from Gorzów Wielkopolski
1988 births
Living people
Medalists at the 2012 Summer Paralympics
Polish male high jumpers
Paralympic medalists in athletics (track and field)
Athletes (track and field) at the 2020 Summer Paralympics